Churches for Middle East Peace (CMEP) is a 501(c)(3) non-profit advocacy organization based in Washington, D.C. As a coalition of Orthodox, Catholic and Protestant churches, CMEP works to influence American policy in ways that will bring justice and peace for all people and countries in the Middle East. In addition, Churches for Middle East Peace currently has over 100 partner churches, which are religious orders, congregations, church committees, regional church bodies, and church-related organizations such as peace fellowships that commit to working for Middle East peace, and can agree with CMEP's mission and views.

Advocacy 
CMEP has the following policy positions:

1) Pursue a just and durable resolution of the Israeli–Palestinian crisis in which Israelis and Palestinians realize the vision of a just peace, which illuminates human dignity and cultivates thriving relationships.
2) Pursue an end to the Israeli occupation of East Jerusalem, the West Bank, and the Gaza Strip, to promote a solution that advances security and self-determination for Israelis and Palestinians;
3) Recognize settlements as illegal and an impediment to peace and ensure accountability for policies about settlements which disregard legal restraints and international consensus;
4) Promote a shared Jerusalem by Palestinians and Israelis, as well as full access to the Holy Sites by the three religious traditions -- Jews, Muslims, and Christians -- by those who call them holy;
5) Promote restorative justice, trauma healing, and multi-level peacebuilding efforts with a particular recognition of the contribution and role of women;
6) In order to defend free speech and religious liberty,  uphold the right of churches and organizations to find appropriate and various ways to end unjust practices and policies that violate international laws and conventions, including exerting economic leverage on commercial and government actors;
7) Support the right for engagement in nonviolent resistance while raising concerns about all forms of violence regardless of actor;
8) Recognize the religious importance of the Middle East to Jews, Christians, and Muslims and others; to protect the religious freedom of all as well as support measures to ensure the viability of the historic Christian community in Palestine, Israel, and the entire region;
9) Encourage negotiated, just, and peaceful resolutions to conflicts in the region and the demilitarization of conflict;
10) Encourage needs and rights based development and humanitarian assistance to reduce inequality and promote human dignity, especially in the West Bank and Gaza while ensuring access and protection for aid agencies and others;
11) Respect for human rights of all in the region, including refugees and displaced people, based on full observance of the Geneva Conventions and other international law agreements;
12) CMEP opposes anti-Semitism, anti-Muslim sentiment, and anti-Christian sentiment and all other forms of racism or bigotry in rhetoric or actions that dehumanize, stereotype, or incite distrust or violence toward anyone.

CMEP emphasizes the important role that Christians have to play in prospects for pluralism and democracy in Palestinian society and supports a safe and secure state of Israel. It urges the United States to pursue the creation of a Palestinian state and the end of Israel's occupation as integral to helping Israel achieve the security, recognition and normalization of relations with all countries of the region that it has long been denied.

CMEP has vocally supported the efforts of the Obama Administration to re-establish direct negotiations between Israeli and Palestinian parties. On August 30, 2010, they organized a letter to President Obama stating support for his goal of ending the occupation that has existed since 1967 and achieving a just and comprehensive two-state solution to the current conflict. Signed by the leadership of 29 national Catholic, Orthodox, mainline Protestant, Evangelical, and historic African American denominations and organizations, the letter acknowledged the difficulties in achieving this goal, but pledged the U.S. Christian community's efforts to expand the dialogue with American Jewish and Palestinian communities to help achieve this goal.

CMEP has also advocated for U.S. leadership in ending the humanitarian crisis in Gaza. In June 2010 they issued a statement advocating for the relief of the blockade of Gaza. In doing so, they affirmed their position that Palestinians have the right to more than just humanitarian aid. They are entitled "to trade, travel, study, and engage in productive work, subject only to reasonable security requirements, and to take part in building a viable Palestinian state together with those who live in the West Bank. Israel has the right to self-defense and to prevent illicit trafficking in arms."

CMEP takes an even handed approach, emphasizing the need for both sides to create the conditions for peace. During the 2008–2009 Gaza War, CMEP acknowledged that "Israel's massive military operation has taken a terrible toll on Gaza's population and public infrastructure, while ongoing indiscriminate rocket attacks against towns in southern Israel have made normal life there impossible." CMEP has received praise for its bi-partisan and even handed approach, seeking only to move toward a negotiated peace for both Israel and Palestinians.

Management and organizational structure 
Churches for Middle East Peace's executive director, Rev. Dr. Mae Elise Cannon is a minister, writer, and academic. She has authored several books, including Social Justice Handbook: Small Steps for a Better World (IVP, 2009) and Just Spirituality: How Faith Practices Fuel Social Action (IVP, 2013) and was a co-author of Forgive Us: Confessions of a Compromised Faith (Zondervan, 2014). Cannon is an ordained pastor in the Evangelical Covenant Church (ECC). Her ministry and professional background includes serving as the Senior Director of Advocacy and Outreach for World Vision-US, the executive pastor of Hillside Covenant Church (Walnut Creek, California), Director of Development and Transformation for Extension Ministries at Willow Creek Community Church (Barrington, Illinois), and as a consultant to the Middle East for child advocacy issues for Compassion International. She earned her doctorate in American history with the minor in Middle Eastern studies from the University of California – Davis, focusing her dissertation on the history of the American Protestant church in Israel and Palestine. Cannon holds an M.Div. From North Park Theological Seminary, an M.B.A. from North Park University's School of Business and Nonprofit Management, and an M.A. in bioethics from Trinity International University.

CMEP's governing board, which makes all policy decisions, is composed of staff from the national policy offices of the coalition members in addition to two independent members. This board makes all policy decisions by consensus. CMEP staff and the board implement these through concrete educational and advocacy actions. CMEP's Board Members include:

Alliance of Baptists

American Baptist Churches USA

Antiochian Orthodox Christian Archdiocese of North America

Armenian Orthodox Church

Catholic Conference of Major Superiors of Men's Institutes

Christian Church (Disciples of Christ)/Common Global Ministries Board

Christian Reformed Church

Church of the Brethren

Church World Service

The Episcopal Church

Evangelical Covenant Church

Evangelical Lutheran Church in America

Evangelicals for Social Action

Franciscan Friars

Friends Committee on National Legislation

Greek Orthodox Archdiocese of America

Moravian Church in America

National Council of Churches

Presbyterian Church (USA)

Reformed Church in America

Unitarian Universalist Association

United Church of Christ/Common Global Ministries Board

United Methodist Church/ General Board of Church and Society

United Methodist Church/ Women's Division

Statements about CMEP

References

External links 

 Website: http://www.cmep.org/

Foreign policy political advocacy groups in the United States
United States–Middle Eastern relations
1984 establishments in the United States